Kaiser Tufail  is a retired Pakistani fighter pilot. Outside of his military service, Tufail is an active blogger, aviation historian and has delivered motivational speeches at TEDx conferences.

Service
Kaiser Tufail was commissioned in 1975. After performing duties as a squadron pilot, he went on to command a fighter squadron (No.8 Tactical Attack Squadron equipped with Mirage 5) at PAF Base Masroor and a flying wing (No 34 Tactical Attack Wing) at PAF Base Rafiqui. Later he commanded PAF Base Shahbaz and PAF Base Masroor.

He has had the opportunity of flying virtually all types of trainers and fighters of the PAF during his service. These include T-6G Harvard, MFI-17 Mushaak, T-37, FT-5 (dual-seat MiG-17), F-6 (MiG-19), Mirage-III/5, F-16A/B Fighting Falcon, Mirage F-1E (Qatari AF), F-7P (MiG-21) and the F-7PG (F-7 double-delta variant).

Kaiser Tufail was the Director of Operations of the Pakistan Air Force (PAF) during the Kargil conflict. He served as Deputy Commandant and Commandant of the PAF Air War College. He also served as Senior Air Staff Officer (SASO) at the Southern Air Command before retiring in 2005.

Kaiser Tufail is a graduate of the PAF Air War College and the National Defence College (National Defence University) and holds master's degrees in Strategic Studies and War Studies.

Works as an aviation historian

Books

 Great Air Battles of Pakistan Air Force
 In The Ring and On Its Feet

Articles
 "Jacobabad Tales"
 "Alam's Speed-shooting Classic"
 "Run … it's a 104"
 "PAF on the Offensive – 1971 War"
 "The Gujarat Beechcraft Incident – 1965 War"
 "Air Defence in Northern Sector – 1971 War"
 "Air Support in Chamb – 1971 War"
 "Air Support in Shakargarh – 1971 War"
 "Air Support at Sea – 1971 War"
 "F-6s at War"
 "Air Support in Thar – 1971 War"
 "Mirages at War"
 "Kargil Conflict and Pakistan Air Force"
 "Shahbaz Over Golan"
 "It is the Man Behind the Gun"
 "A Hard Nut to Crack"
 "Cheapest Kill"
 "A Sword for Hussein"
 "Bo Kaata"
 "Mystery of the Downed Mystère"
 "Theirs But to Do and Die"

Awards and decorations

References

External links
 Blogger URL
 Aeronaut – Anthology of articles on fighter flying, air wars, etc, by Kaiser Tufail
 Footloose – Anthology of articles on adventure, exploration and travel, by Kaiser Tufail
 A dialogue with an aviator

Living people
Air force historians
Pakistan Air Force officers
Pakistani aviators
Pakistani military historians
Year of birth missing (living people)